Follow the Sun is a 1951 biographical film of the life of golf legend Ben Hogan. It stars Glenn Ford as Hogan and Anne Baxter as his wife. Many golfers and sports figures of the day appear in the movie.

Plot
The movie is a fictionalization of the life of American golf great Ben Hogan, narrated by Anne Baxter as Hogan's wife.

In Fort Worth, Texas, young Ben Hogan (Harold Blake) works as a golf caddy to help support his family and dreams of becoming a professional golfer. Grown up (Glenn Ford), he quits his job in a garage, marries childhood sweetheart Valerie Fox (Anne Baxter), buys a used car, and sets out on the tour—discovering along the way that Valerie gets carsick.

At his first professional tournament, in Niagara Falls, Chuck Williams (Dennis O'Keefe), a popular fellow pro, takes Hogan under his wing and they become best friends. (The locker room scene features several golfers of the day playing themselves.) Hogan makes the mistake of offending noted sportswriter Jay Dexter (Larry Keating), who mistakes Hogan's reticence for arrogance. Hogan has trouble concentrating and freezes; he considers giving up, but Valerie talks him out of it. They go on, traveling around the country from tournament to tournament, following the sun in the caravan that is the pro tour.

At the Oakland Open, the Hogans are down to $5 and are weary of a diet of oranges. He ties for 6th, winning $285, and Valerie exclaims that the gallery doesn't scare him anymore. However, the price of Ben's concentration is a reputation for being aloof.

His career prospers in the next few years, but World War II interrupts. After serving in the Air Force, Hogan returns to golfing and becomes a great champion. He is still unable to talk to fans or clown around, and has acquired an image in the media of a robotic, cold competitor with the nickname "The Texas Iceberg". He envies Williams his easy way with fans.

At the Bing Crosby Tournament in Pebble Beach, he wins, beating Williams. His former commanding officer says hello but Ben doesn't see him, he is concentrating so much on the game. Ben apologizes when the general tells him about it after the tournament and chastises himself for not being able to play golf and play to the gallery at the same time and give the fans what they want. Meanwhile Williams has developed a drinking problem that is interfering with his golf and breaking up his marriage to Norma (June Havoc).

Hogan is now the biggest money winner in golf. A fictional tournament described in the film as "The Big One" in Los Angeles, pits Williams and Hogan against each other. Hogan wins and Williams and his wife mysteriously move on without a word.

In 1949, on their way back to Fort Worth, Texas, to move into a home Valerie has bought for them, a bus drives head-on into their car on a fog-bound road. The film re-creates Hogan throwing himself in front of his wife to protect her, an act of selflessness that also saved him: The steering wheel impaled the driver's seat.

At first, the police think Hogan is dead. He has crush injuries to his pelvis, legs and shoulder. The doctors are afraid of clot formation and the necessary specialist is in New Orleans. Valerie calls Gen. Richardson and he arranges for a plane to fly there. The operations are successful, but there is a long road ahead. Dr. Graham (Roland Winters) suggests taking one hurdle at a time.

Hogan is amazed by the outpouring of regard from his fans; his hospital room is flooded with flowers, cards and letters. "I should have taken my eye off the ball and taken a good look at people", he says. He'd like "to play just once more for the gallery." Chuck and Norma Williams, now happy together, come to the hospital room with golf legends Jimmy Demaret and Dr. Cary Middlecoff, who tell Hogan he is to be captain of the team when they go to England for the Ryder Cup, whether or not he can play.

Through determination and exercise he becomes well enough to go home, where he steadily recovers. (The fact that very little screen time is spent on his rehabilitation may intentionally reflect the amazing speed of Hogan's real-life recovery.) One day, Valerie comes home to find he has taken a taxi to a driving range. The ballboy tells him he needs to pivot, shift his weight from leg to leg, and in trying this, Hogan falls. Valerie is afraid and angry—the doctors have warned him not to play golf because the danger of clots will never go away. She "can't take it". But after watching him suffer sitting alone at home wishing he could play, she changes her mind.

Newspaper headlines announce that "Iron Man" Hogan will play in the 1950 Los Angeles Open, traditionally the opening event of the professional golf season. Re-creation of the tournament includes appearances by Dr. Cary Middlecoff, Jimmy Demaret, Sam Snead and others. Williams, who says he withdrew from the tournament because going on the wagon has given him the shakes, comes to the locker room to give Hogan a pep talk. Ben asks him to level with him, and Williams says that it's about the legs, the stamina needed. Hogan "can't shoot 69s for four days in a row on guts."

This time the big gallery is rooting for him, and Hogan does well even through days of pouring rain. The sun comes out on the 18th green, and Hogan ends with 69 for the last round, leading the field. The Hogans and Williamses listen to the radio as Sam Snead matches Hogan's score, making a playoff necessary. Hogan loses to Snead in the playoff, but is applauded and honored at a tribute dinner from the "sportswriting fraternity" with Grantland Rice playing himself as toastmaster. Hogan gives a brief but moving speech, and the film ends with a re-creation of the Time magazine cover honoring Hogan's 1950 win of the U.S. Open.

In real life, Hogan's greatest golfing achievements were still to come, and in the 21st century he is considered to be one of the greatest players in the history of the game.

Cast
 Glenn Ford – Ben Hogan 
 Anne Baxter – Valerie Hogan 
 Dennis O'Keefe – Chuck Williams 
 June Havoc – Norma Williams
 Larry Keating – Sportswriter Jay Dexter 
 Roland Winters – Dr. Graham 
 Nana Bryant – Sister Beatrice 
 Harold Blake – Ben Hogan, Age 14 
 Ann Burr – Valerie, Age 14 
 Jimmy Demaret – Himself 
 Cary Middlecoff – Himself 
 Grantland Rice – Himself, Toastmaster 
 Sam Snead – Himself
 Harry G. Reader Jr. – Chuck Williams' Caddy at Pebble Beach

Radio adaptation
Follow the Sun was presented on Lux Radio Theatre March 10, 1952. The one-hour adaptation starred Anne Baxter and Gary Merrill.

References

External links

1951 films
1950s biographical drama films
20th Century Fox films
American biographical drama films
Golf films
Sports films based on actual events
Biographical films about sportspeople
Films based on biographies
Films directed by Sidney Lanfield
Films scored by Cyril J. Mockridge
Cultural depictions of golfers
Cultural depictions of American men
1951 drama films
Films based on newspaper and magazine articles
American black-and-white films
1950s English-language films
1950s American films